The 2008 ISSF World Cup Final was divided into two parts:
 2008 ISSF World Cup Final (shotgun)
 2008 ISSF World Cup Final (rifle and pistol)